The Withers Log House, at 344 Wassou in Crystal Bay, Nevada, is a historic house that was built in 1931.  It was listed on the National Register of Historic Places in 2000.

It was deemed significant as a good example of "a modest, but well-designed and beautifully detailed log vacation home" which was one of the first homes built in the Crystal Bay Corporation's subdivision in the north shore area of Lake Tahoe.

References

External links

National Register of Historic Places in Washoe County, Nevada
Houses completed in 1931
Houses on the National Register of Historic Places in Nevada
Houses in Washoe County, Nevada